J.C. Teasley House was a historic home located at Mullins, Marion County, South Carolina. The house consisted of the original block built about 1875, with a post-1901 wing, which became the principal façade of the house. It was a modest single-story frame house constructed in a classic folk form quite common throughout the rural South. It was the home of James Chesley Teasley (1861-1942), a prominent Marion County businessman.  It is located in the Mullins Commercial Historic District.

It was listed in the National Register of Historic Places in 2001.

References

Houses on the National Register of Historic Places in South Carolina
Houses in Marion County, South Carolina
National Register of Historic Places in Marion County, South Carolina
Historic district contributing properties in South Carolina